WYFG (91.1 FM) is a radio station simulcasting the Bible Broadcasting Network for the Gaffney, Spartanburg, and Greenville areas of South Carolina as well as some of the western suburbs of the Charlotte area.

The transmitter is located off South Carolina Highway 11 atop Thicketty Mountain (which is about 5 miles east of Chesnee).

History
WYFG went on the air on October 12, 1982. The station broadcasts with 100 kilowatts, reaching 241 towns and cities in its listening area, which is in Upstate South Carolina and Piedmont, North Carolina.

References
BBN Radio website

Bible Broadcasting Network
Radio stations established in 1982
1982 establishments in South Carolina
YFG